Henrik Høve Jørgensen (10 October 1961 – 26 January 2019) was a Danish marathon runner, who won the London Marathon in 1988. He finished 5th in 1985 in 2:09.43 hours – this time remains the Danish national record and stood as the Nordic record for over 30 years until beaten by Sondre Nordstad Moen in 2017. Born in Herlev, Jørgensen represented his native country in the men's marathon at the 1984 and the 1988 Summer Olympics in Seoul, South Korea. He was a two-time national champion in the men's 5000 m.

Jørgensen competed for Iowa State University, Ames, Iowa, USA until 1982, returning to Denmark later that year. .

Jørgensen died on Bornholm in January 2019 aged 57, from a heart attack during a training run

Danish distance runner Anna Holm Baumeister is Jørgensen's daughter.

Achievements

References

 Dansk Atletik Forbund i tal

1961 births
2019 deaths
Danish male long-distance runners
Danish male marathon runners
Athletes (track and field) at the 1984 Summer Olympics
Athletes (track and field) at the 1988 Summer Olympics
Olympic athletes of Denmark
Athletes from Copenhagen
London Marathon male winners
20th-century Danish people
21st-century Danish people